Hecatesia is a genus of moths of the family Noctuidae. The genus was erected by Jean Baptiste Boisduval in 1829.

Species
 Hecatesia exultans Walker, [1865]
 Hecatesia fenestrata Boisduval, 1829
 Hecatesia thyridion Feisthamel, 1839

References

Agaristinae